The Ludington Daily News is the daily newspaper of Ludington, Michigan. The paper traces its origins back to September 17, 1867, the date of the first issue of the predecessor Mason County Record. The first issue of the Ludington Daily Sun was published on April 5, 1901, and the paper was renamed the Ludington Daily News in 1906. It is owned by Shoreline Media, which has been a subsidiary of Community Media Group since January 1, 2012.

References

External links

Newspapers published in Michigan
Mason County, Michigan
Newspapers established in 1867
1867 establishments in Michigan